Andrei Viktorovich Nazarov (born May 22, 1974) is a Russian former professional ice hockey player and head coach of HC Sochi of the Kontinental Hockey League (KHL). He has formerly managed the Kazakh team Barys Astana (of the Kontinental Hockey League's Chernyshev Division), the Ukrainian national team and been joint coach of the Russian National Hockey Team. He has been nicknamed the "Russian Bear", and in his coaching career, the "Russian Keenan".

Nazarov was drafted 10th overall by the San Jose Sharks in the 1992 NHL Entry Draft. He also played for the Tampa Bay Lightning, Calgary Flames, Mighty Ducks of Anaheim, Boston Bruins, Phoenix Coyotes and the Minnesota Wild.  In his NHL career, Nazarov played 571 regular season games, scoring 53 goals and 71 assists for 124 points.  He also collected 1,409 penalty minutes.

Nazarov served only one season (2013-2014) as the coach of HC Donbass before moving to Barys.

In 2021, without any evidence, Nazarov accused NHL star Artemi Panarin of assaulting a woman. Nazarov, a known supporter of Russian leader Vladimir Putin, has repeatedly and publicly criticized Panarin for his outspoken beliefs regarding Putin’s regime.

Career statistics

Regular season and playoffs

International

References

External links
 

1974 births
Living people
Avangard Omsk players
Boston Bruins players
Calgary Flames players
HC Dynamo Moscow players
Metallurg Novokuznetsk players
Houston Aeros (1994–2013) players
Kansas City Blades players
Kazakhstan men's national ice hockey team coaches
Kentucky Thoroughblades players
Mighty Ducks of Anaheim players
Minnesota Wild players
National Hockey League first-round draft picks
Sportspeople from Chelyabinsk
Phoenix Coyotes players
Russia men's national ice hockey team coaches
Russian ice hockey coaches
Russian ice hockey left wingers
San Jose Sharks draft picks
San Jose Sharks players
Soviet ice hockey left wingers
Tampa Bay Lightning players
Russian expatriate sportspeople in Ukraine
Ukraine men's national ice hockey team coaches